Kailashahar Legislative Assembly constituency is one of the 60 Legislative Assembly constituencies of Tripura state in India.

It is part of Unakoti district.

Members of the Legislative Assembly

Election results

2018

See also
 List of constituencies of the Tripura Legislative Assembly
 Unakoti district

References

Unakoti district
Assembly constituencies of Tripura